Man's Right to Knowledge was a radio program that ran from January 3, 1954 to December 26, 1954 on CBS. Created by Columbia University on the occasion of its bicentennial, the show consisted of two weekly lecture series, each episode featuring a different prominent academic or world leader. The university's president, Grayson L. Kirk, hosted the series. The content of each lecture centered around the university's bicentennial theme, "Man's Right to Knowledge and the Free Use Thereof". The first series, titled Man's Right to Knowledge: Tradition and Change, ran for thirteen weeks beginning on January 3. The second, titled Man's Right to Knowledge: Present Knowledge and Future Directions, ran for another thirteen weeks beginning on October 3. The final lecture, delivered by J. Robert Oppenheimer in his first public appearance since the end of his security hearings earlier that year, marked the official end of the Bicentennial.

The show was wildly successful—within three months of the show's debut, the university had already received 10,000 requests for reprints of the talks; its episodes were eventually transcribed and published in two volumes. By September 1954, the book version of the first series had sold over 22,000 copies. The series was translated and rebroadcast across the world, and won a 1954 Peabody Award for its "unprecedented impact", and the way it "stimulated a crusade for free inquiry and free expression—and helped to give to millions of individuals a deeper understanding of their rights to knowledge."

Episodes

Man's Right to Knowledge: Tradition and Change

Man's Right to Knowledge: Present Knowledge and Future Directions

References 

Columbia University
1950s American radio programs
Peabody Award-winning radio programs
1954 radio programme debuts
1954 radio programme endings
CBS Radio programs
Lecture series